KUAM-LP, UHF analog channel 20, was a low-power CBS-affiliated television station serving the U.S. territory of Guam that was licensed to Tamuning. The station was owned by Pacific Telestations, Inc.

History

KUAM-LP began telecasting on November 20, 1995, with CBS programming, which had previously been shared between KTGM and sister station KUAM-TV, who wanted to focus more on their ABC and NBC affiliations, respectively. The move would result in adding more of their respective networks' programming for each station, as opposed to airing selected CBS shows for KUAM-TV and KTGM to air. KUAM-LP also carried programs from The WB on a secondary basis from their inception until June 2001, when it moved to KTGM.

Because of its LPTV status, the station also aired its programming on cable channel 11, which helped reach its audience on the island. On February 18, 2009, KUAM-LP began simulcasting on KUAM's digital subchannel 8.2, extending its over-the-air reach throughout Guam. KUAM-LP was one of the few television stations to sign off at night. It signed off at 1:30 a.m. and did not air Up to the Minute. Instead, during its downtime, the station simply aired CBS network promos and public service announcements overnight.

The station's license was canceled by the Federal Communications Commission (FCC) on September 4, 2013. Its CBS programming continues to air on KUAM-DT2.

See also
Channel 11 branded TV stations in the United States
Channel 20 low-power TV stations in the United States

External links
KUAM.com - Official Website

UAM-LP
Television channels and stations established in 1995
Television channels and stations disestablished in 2013
1995 establishments in Guam
2013 disestablishments in Guam
Defunct television stations in the United States
UAM-LP